Gabrsko is a settlement in the Municipality of Trbovlje in central Slovenia. It lies immediately north of the town of Trbovlje. The area is part of the traditional region of Styria. It is now included with the rest of the municipality in the Central Sava Statistical Region.

Notable people
Notable people that were born or lived in Gabrsko include:
 Miha Marinko (1900–1983), communist politician

References

External links
Gabrsko on Geopedia

Populated places in the Municipality of Trbovlje